Souvanpheng Bouphanouvong  is a Laotian politician. She is a member of the Lao People's Revolutionary Party. As of 2008, she was a representative of the National Assembly of Laos for the city of Vientiane (Constituency 1).

References

21st-century Laotian women politicians
21st-century Laotian politicians
Lao People's Revolutionary Party politicians
Living people
Members of the National Assembly of Laos
Year of birth missing (living people)